Coven is a 2020 historical drama film directed by Pablo Agüero, starring Amaia Aberasturi and Alex Brendemühl.

It won five Goya Awards from a total of nine nominations at the 35th Goya Awards. At the 8th Feroz Awards, the film was nominated in six categories.

The film was produced by Sorgin Films, Lamia Producciones Audiovisuales, Kowalski Films, Gariza Produkzioak, Tita Productions, 
La Fidèle Productions, Tita B. Productions and Campocine.

Plot 
In 1609 in the Basque Country a group of five teenagers are captured and arrested as main suspects of witchcraft, as they celebrated a party in the woods. Judge Rostegui, given the task of purifying the region by the King, arrests the girls and accuses them of witchcraft. He decides to do whatever it takes to make them confess, and tell him what they know about the akelarre, a ceremony with magical connotations, during which the Devil is said to initiate his servants and mate with them.

Even though they deny it, and there is no evidence against them, they are arrested and tortured in order to force them to sign a written confession. After another of their friends is arrested, one of the girls, Ana, confesses to be a witch, claiming she cast a spell on the rest of her sisters and friends. Ana's plan is to gain enough time for the girls to organise an escape when the men of the village return from their fishing. As a result she spends a whole day confessing a detailed sabbath festivity - in reality a twisted version of the party she and the girls held before their arrest. 

Judge Rostegui postpones the girls execution when Ana says she can only use her magic in every full moon night as she feels Lucifer's calling. Her portrayal convinces Rostegui who offers to deliver every item for the sabbath which causes some of his men to distrust him. One of his allies warns him that after the full moon, the village men will return and the girls will be set free. Rostegui rushes the girls execution and takes them to the woods for the ceremony with all of Ana's specifications. Understanding their situation, Ana leads her friends in a dance demonstration as they play along as witches and sing in the Basque language. Rostegui is entranced, but all of his men, along with village's priest are frightened of the "sabbath". 

Ana and the rest of the girls flee as Rostegui and his men have an argument; a chase through the woods ensues until the girls are cornered at a cliff. As they join hands, one of the village women elders sings in Basque about the tide brought by the full moon which motivates the girls to jump off from the cliff to Rostegui and his men's surprise.

Cast
 Amaia Aberasturi as Ana
 Alex Brendemühl as Rostegui
 Daniel Fanego as Consejero
 Garazi Urkola as Katalin
 Yune Nogueiras as María

Reception
Coven received generally positive reviews from film critics.

Awards

References

External links
 
 

2020 films
2020 drama films
Basque-language films
2020s Spanish-language films
2020s historical drama films
Argentine historical drama films
French historical drama films
Spanish historical drama films
Films directed by Pablo Agüero
Films produced by Fred Prémel
Films produced by Iker Ganuza
Films produced by Koldo Zuazua
Films with screenplays by Pablo Agüero
Films with screenplays by Katell Guillou
Films set in the 1600s
Kowalski Films films
2020s Spanish films
2020s French films
2020s Argentine films